Cinderella with Four Knights is a South Korean television series directed by Kwon Hyuk-chan and Lee Min-woo, and starring Park So-dam, Jung Il-woo, Ahn Jae-hyun, Lee Jung-shin, Choi Min, and Son Na-eun. It aired on tvN from August 12 to October 1, 2016.

Based on the web novel with the same title published in 2011, the series is about a group of passionate young people in their 20s who happen to live together. It drew parallels to the 2009 TV series Boys Over Flowers.

Synopsis
Eun Ha-won (Park So-dam) is a bright high school senior who dreams of becoming a teacher. Unfortunately, she loses her mother in a tragic accident. When her father remarries, her cruel stepmother moves in and steals Ha-won's college tuition. She is forced to take on part-time jobs to make payments for her mother's memorial and her college tuition. She meets an older man, chairman of large corporation who convinces her to move into his mansion with his three grandsons who are heirs to his family fortune. Between the rebel-minded loner Kang Ji-woon (Jung Il-woo), playboy money machine Kang Hyun-min (Ahn Jae-hyun) and the super-sweet singer Kang Seo-woo (Lee Jung-shin), Ha-won finds herself in the middle of the hottest love quadrangle to ever befall a modern fairy tale. Rounding out the mansion's chaebol lifestyle are Lee Yoon-sung (Choi Min) who serves as the cousins' handsome bodyguard, and Park Hye-ji (Son Na-eun), a  girl who has been neighbors and in love with Hyun-min since childhood.

Cast

Main

Cinderella
Park So-dam as Eun Ha-won
A smart, athletic high school student. Ever since her mother died, she lives a terrible home life because of the ill-treatment from her new stepmother and stepsister. In order to pay for her college tuition, she accepts an invitation to the Sky House and gets entangled with the Kang cousins. She met Kang Ji-woon at their mothers’ funerals, giving him her white ribbon hair pin and he gave her his white arm band. Their friendship was a brief one, so they could not recognize each other when reunited after 10 years.

The Four Knights
 Jung Il-woo as Kang Ji-woon
The middle cousin, who went from an orphan living in poverty to a royalty overnight. Although he seems to be wild and rebellious on the outside, he is soft-hearted, extremely lonely and sensitive on the inside. At first, he tries to get closer to Ha-won in order to protect Hye-ji, who likes Hyun-min. However, as he gets to know Ha-won, he gradually falls in love with her. He originally met Ha-won at his mother's double funeral with Ha-won's mother, and gave words of comfort and his white arm band to her, while she gave him her white ribbon hair pin. It is suggested that their friendship was a brief one as they could not recognize each other when they were reunited after 10 years.
 Ahn Jae-hyun as Kang Hyun-min
Jeon Jin-seo as young Kang Hyun-min
The eldest cousin, an arrogant playboy who is used to getting whatever he wants. He firmly believes he can win any woman. At first, he appears to take an interest in Ha-won and pretends to be Ha-won's fiancé. However, he is still in love with Hye-ji, his childhood friend and his dead best friend's sister, but he hides the fact and chose to push her away due to his childhood trauma. As the time comes, he realizes his foolishness for pushing Hye-ji away and apologizes to her for what he did and returns to her, his first true love. He has a troubled relationship with his mother due her constantly pushing him to be Haneul Group's successor, and for abandoning him when he was younger, only coming back to ask about his position.
Lee Jung-shin as Kang Seo-woo
The youngest cousin, a popular singer-songwriter. He is a sweet, playful guy who is affectionate towards Ha-won whom he starts developing feelings for. He gives up his first love as he gets to know about Ha-won and Ji-woon's relationship. In the finale, it is hinted that he possibly ended up with Ja-yeong.
Choi Min as Lee Yoon-sung
The secretary of Chairman Kang, and bodyguard to the three Kang cousins and Ha-won. He treats Ha-won well and helps her settle into her new environment at Sky House. He protects Haneul Group by voting against the removal of chairman Kang, going against Chairman Kang's fifth wife, who turns out to be his mother.

People around the four Knights
Son Na-eun as Park Hye-ji 
A university student majoring in fashion design. She is a childhood friend of Hyun-min, and has liked him since they were kids. She tried using Ji-woon's crush on her to get closer to Hyun-min. She has a genuine and pure heart, but is constantly at battle with it because of Hyun-min constantly pushing her away, especially after her brother's death.
Kim Yong-gun as Chairman Kang Jong-du
Chairman of Kang Group and the Kang cousins' grandfather. He is the reason behind Ji-woon not having his father present in his life because he forcibly ended his parents' relationship, citing that people from different social classes should not be together. He almost does the same to Ji-woon and Ha-won, but relents and lets the couple be happy, not wanting history to repeat itself.
Kim Hye-ri as Ji Hwa-ja
Chairman Kang's fifth wife, and the mother of Yoon-sung. She schemed to take over Haneul Group, by taking advantage of Chairman Kang being in coma, and briefly placed her son as CEO of Haneul Group. Her efforts were foiled by Kang Hyun-min convincing enough of the board against removing his grandfather and also secretly by her own son. Chairman Kang divorces her, but relents and starts a relationship with her again.

Supporting

People around Cinderella
Seo Hyun-chul as Eun Gi-sang
Ha-won's father. He works as a dump-truck driver at construction site. After his wife's death, he believed Eun Ha-won to not be his daughter, and thus hated not only her, but her deceased mother as well, therefore kicking her out. His theory was disproved by Kang Young-jin, and he tries to make amends with his daughter again. He also moves his second wife and step-daughter to the same small room that Eun Ha-won slept in at the beginning of the series, as punishment for their cruel treatment of his daughter.
Choi Eun-kyung as Park Soo-kyung
Ha-won's stepmother. She works at a spa and dreams of getting her daughter rich and famous. She is eventually fired from her job for trying to offer her service as a spy to Madam Kang, in a vain and ill-thought-out plan to have her daughter marry one of the Kang cousins and make her famous.
Go Bo-gyeol as Choi Yu-na 
Ha-won's stepsister. She aims to be a top star one day and marry Kang Hyun-min. Her grades in school were poor, seeing as how she could not get into university, and is lazy and unemployed. She tries to switch her advances to Kang Seo-woo but is rebuffed by him writing in her autograph book to "be nice to Eun Ha-won". She is childish and immature because her mother constantly spoils her and never made her lift a finger to work in her life, and thus relies on her mother for everything.
Cho Hye-jung as Hong Ja-yeong
Ha-won's best friend who works part-time at the cafe. She met Eun Ha-won when she could not afford food, and Ha won gave her some of her almost expired food. They have been best friends since then. She has a mother who works full-time, and a father who cannot work yet due to recovering from cancer treatment. She is a fan of Kang Seo-woo, and it is hinted that she becomes his girlfriend in the series finale.

Others
Jo Mi-ryung
Kang Eui-sik as Hyun-min's friend
Kim Sun-woong as Hyun-min's Friend
Kim Seon-woong as Hyun-min's friend
Shin Dong-mi as Park Ok-seon, Ha-won's mother
She died before the main events of the series. Ha-won's father believed her to be unfaithful to him, but this was proven to be false. She died alongside Ji-woon's mother, trying to save her. Ji-woon's mother entrusted her with her wedding ring to give to Ji-woon, but this ring ended up being mistakenly given to Ha-won.
Jin Hye-won as Hye-ji's friend
Jung Young-joo as housemaid
Kim Jin-tae
Jo Kyung-hoon as Ji-woon's boss
Kim Kang-hyun as Seo-woo's manager
Lee Ah-hyun as Seo-woo's mother
She is very easy going and somewhat childish, but still loves her son a great deal, and is still very much in love with her deceased husband, Seo-woo's father.
Son Seon-geun
Park Kyu-jeom as Director Kim
Gong Da-im
Park Hyo-jun as customer in car center
Kim Kwang-seop
Jo Eun-suk as Hyun-min's mother
Cold and arrogant, she only cares about her son succeeding Haneul Group, constantly pressuring him to stay as the main heir.
Gong Jung-hwan as Kang Young-jin
He was mistaken as Ha-Won's biological father, but this turned out to be false. He tried using this false information to his advantage by getting money from Ji-Woon to pay his debt, but was foiled by Ha-won. 
Jin Ju-hyung as Jun-su, Hyun-min's friend
Na In-woo as Joon Soo, Hyun-min's friend
Kim Ji-sung as Han Ji-seon, Ji-woon's mother
Deceased before the events of the series; she dies alongside Ha-won's mother and begged Ha-won's mother to give her ring to Ji-woon as her dying wish. She did not let Ji-woon's grandfather know him for fear that he would not be able to love someone without the worry of social status and might be ripped apart like her and Ji-woon's father were.
Kim Young-jae as Ji-woon's father
He was forcibly separated from Ji-woon's mother by his own father who believed that people of different social classes should not be together. It is believed he died before he could ever find out about his son.
Kim In-ho as doctor
Jun Hye-young
Kim So-hye
Song Ha-rim
Kang Seok-ho
Song Woo-suk
Kim Su-in
Seo Han-gyul

Special appearances
 Moon Se-yoon as a convenience store manager (Ep. 1–2)
 Park Young-soo as Butler Kim (Ep. 1)
 Choi Dae-sung as a man in cloth store (Ep. 1)
 Park Eun-ji as a TV reporter (Ep. 1)
 Seo Bo-ik as a reporter (Ep. 2)
Chun Yi-seul as Kang Hyun-min's blind date (Ep. 4)
 Park Gwi-sun as a monk (Ep. 6)
 Kim Dong-gyun as a plastic surgery doctor (Ep. 7)
 Hyun Suk-hee as an orphanage's headmaster (Ep. 13)
 Choi Kyu-hwan as Carry Hong, a clothing designer and friend of Hyun-min's who offers Hye-ji a chance to study design in Paris. (Ep. 15-16)

Filming location
The "Sky House" is the clubhouse of the luxury golf resort South Cape Owners Club on the southern coast of Changseon Island in Namhae County in the Southern Gyeongsang Province in South Korea.

Original soundtrack

Part 1

Part 2

Part 3

Part 4

Part 5

Part 6

Part 7

Part 8

Part 9

Ratings

Awards and nominations

References

External links
 
Cinderella with Four Knights at Studio Dragon 
Cinderella with Four Knights at HB Entertainment 

TVN (South Korean TV channel) television dramas
2016 South Korean television series debuts
2016 South Korean television series endings
Television shows based on South Korean novels
South Korean romantic comedy television series
South Korean teen dramas
Television series about teenagers
Television series by Studio Dragon
Television series by HB Entertainment
Korean-language television shows